KABW (95.1 FM) is a country music radio station, licensed to Baird, Texas, a town near Abilene, Texas. KABW's on-air personalities include Wolf Mornings with Kate & Kaden, Lisa Thomas, Randy Brooks.

History
On September 11, 2012, KORQ's Callsign changed KABW and its format changed from CHR to country.

References

External links

Callahan County, Texas
Country radio stations in the United States
ABW